Opyt is a rural locality (a settlement) and the administrative center of Grishevskoye Rural Settlement, Podgorensky District, Voronezh Oblast, Russia. The population was 733 as of 2010. There are 10 streets.

Geography 
Opyt is located 13 km northwest of Podgorensky (the district's administrative centre) by road. Stepanovka is the nearest rural locality.

References 

Rural localities in Podgorensky District